Sellner may refer to:

 Martin Sellner (born 1989), Austrian Identitarian leader
 Rudolf Sellner (1905–1990), German actor, dramaturge, stage director and intendant